Hoeflea alexandrii is a Gram-negative, oxidase-negative, catalase-positive, non-spore-forming, motile bacteria with a single polar flagella from the genus of Hoeflea which was isolated from Alexandrium minutum AL1V in Vigo in Spain.

References

External links
Type strain of Hoeflea alexandrii at BacDive -  the Bacterial Diversity Metadatabase

Rhizobiaceae
Bacteria described in 2006